James Mafuta (born 11 January 1965) is a Zambian judoka. He competed in the men's extra-lightweight event at the 1984 Summer Olympics.

References

External links
 

1965 births
Living people
Zambian male judoka
Olympic judoka of Zambia
Judoka at the 1984 Summer Olympics
Place of birth missing (living people)
African Games medalists in judo
Competitors at the 1987 All-Africa Games
African Games bronze medalists for Zambia
21st-century Zambian people
20th-century Zambian people